Quévert (Gallo: Qevèr) is a commune in the Côtes-d'Armor (Aodoù-an-Arvor) department of Brittany in northwestern France.

Population
Inhabitants of Quévert are called quévertois in French.

See also
Communes of the Côtes-d'Armor department

References

External links

 Rink Hockey Club Quévertois 

Communes of Côtes-d'Armor